Century Development Corporation was established by the Ministry of Economic Affairs (Taiwan) with leading companies from the private sector including TECO Group, Shin Kong Group, Taishin Group, BES Engineering Corporation, RSEA Engineering Corporation,  Fubon Group, and Ascendas (Singapore). The company works with central and local governments throughout Asia to develop technology parks, industrial parks, university buildings, and other educational facilities, as well as infrastructure designed to spur economic development, attract foreign investment, and encourage the development of local industries.

The company is best known for its Nankang Software Park project in Taipei City, Taiwan and the Subic Bay Gateway Park in Subic Bay, Philippines.

See also
 List of companies of Taiwan

References

Companies of Taiwan